Gallt y Daren is a peak in the southern half of the Snowdonia National Park in Gwynedd, North Wales, and forms part of the Arenig mountain range. It is a top of Moel Llyfnant, and is twin peaked. It lies to the west of Moel Llyfnant.

The summit itself is situated on a rocky outcrop offering extensive views of the Rhinogs and Snowdonia to the north.

The peak is often known as Foel Boeth. However, the Nuttall list includes both the twin tops resulting in the higher top being called Gallt y Daren and the lower top being called Foel Boeth (616m). It lies to the west of Moel Llyfnant.

References

Hewitts of Wales
Nuttalls
Mountains and hills of Snowdonia
Llanuwchllyn
Trawsfynydd
Mountains and hills of Gwynedd